John "Jack" Owen (1866 – unknown) was a Welsh footballer who played as a left half for Newton Heath from 1887 to 1893. He also won one cap for Wales while with Newton Heath.

Born in Chirk, Denbighshire, Owen began his football career with Chirk before signing for Newton Heath in October 1887. His elder brother, William, also signed from Chirk at the same time. Owen scored six goals in 90 appearances over the span of a six-year career with the Heathens, before losing his place to new signing Fred Erentz, who would go on to serve the club for almost 10 years.

References
Bibliography

Footnotes

External links
Profile at StretfordEnd.co.uk

1866 births
People from Chirk
Sportspeople from Wrexham County Borough
Welsh footballers
Association football wing halves
Manchester United F.C. players
Chirk AAA F.C. players
Wales international footballers
Year of death missing
Football Alliance players